Menegazzia tenuis is a species of foliose lichen found in southern South America. It was formally described as a new species in 1942 by Swedish lichenologist Rolf Santesson. The type specimen was collected from Puerto Angosto (Desolación Island, Chile) The lichen contains atranorin, lichesterinic acid, and protolichesterinic acid as major lichen products.

See also
List of Menegazzia species

References

tenuis
Lichen species
Lichens described in 1942
Taxa named by Rolf Santesson
Lichens of southern South America